The San Cayetano Formation is a geologic formation in western Cuba. It preserves fossils of mainly ammonites dating back to the Jurassic period.

See also 
 List of fossiliferous stratigraphic units in Cuba

References

Further reading 
 
 H. Pugaczewska. 1978. Jurassic pelecypods from Cuba. Acta Palaeontologica Polonica 23(2):163-186

Geologic formations of Cuba
Jurassic Cuba
Sandstone formations
Siltstone formations
Shale formations
Shallow marine deposits
Formations